Ancaster—Dundas—Flamborough—Westdale was a provincial electoral district in southwestern Ontario, Canada. It was created for the 2007 provincial election. 82.9% of the riding came from Ancaster—Dundas—Flamborough—Aldershot while 17.1% came from Hamilton West.

The riding included all of Hamilton west of a line running along Glancaster Road then to Garner Road then to a Hydroelectric Transmission Line then to Highway 403 to Hamilton Harbour.

In 2018, the district was dissolved into Hamilton West—Ancaster—Dundas and Flamborough—Glanbrook.

Members of Provincial Parliament

Election results

2007 electoral reform referendum

Sources

Elections Ontario Past Election Results

Former provincial electoral districts of Ontario
Politics of Hamilton, Ontario